Sautauriski may refer to:

 Sautauriski Lake, Lac-Jacques-Cartier, Quebec, Canada
 Sautauriski Mountain a mountain in Jacques-Cartier National Park, Quebec, Canada
 Sautauriski River, Stoneham-et-Tewkesbury, Quebec, Canada